Bandish is a 1996 Indian Hindi-language romantic thriller film directed by Prakash Jha, starring Jackie Shroff, Juhi Chawla and Shilpa Shirodkar.

Plot 
Ram Ghulam, an honest man, is trapped in the cities by Kishan. The film has elements of romance, action and tragedy.

Cast 
 Jackie Shroff as Ram Ghulam / Kishan (Dual role)
 Juhi Chawla as Kanta
 Shilpa Shirodkar
 Kader Khan
 Paresh Rawal
 Prakashchandra Dwivedi

Music

References

External links 

Bandish on Cinestaan

1996 films
1990s Hindi-language films
Films directed by Prakash Jha
Films scored by Anand–Milind